Auffarth is a German-language surname. Notable people with the surname include:

 Blythe Auffarth (born 1985), American actress
 Harald Auffarth (died 1946), World War I German fighter ace
 Sandra Auffarth (born 1986), German equestrian

German-language surnames